R-045/R-046 Starshel (Bulgarian: Стършел, Hornet) is a type of electronic countermeasures ammunition, fired by 122 mm or 152 mm artillery guns. It is designed to completely disrupt enemy radio communications on the battlefield.

Design and deployment 
The Starshel rounds were developed and deployed in the early 1980s and were operationally deployed in the mid-80s. By the mid-1990s the rounds were issued to every artillery unit in the Bulgarian army as special ammunition. A full jamming kit consists of several rounds, covering a jamming range of 20 to 100 MHz (with 5 rounds) for the R-045 and from 1.5 to 120 MHz (with 8 rounds) for the R-046. The fins of the round are deployed in-flight. After contact with the ground, an automatic fuze fires the 1,5 meter-long antenna up, which is powered by a small lithium battery for at least an hour. The effective jamming range is at least 700 m. Usually 1 or 2 Starshel kits are used to completely jam enemy front-line communications on a tactical scale.

Specifications 
 R-045 range: 3,000 - 14,500 m
 R-046 range: 4,000 - 16,500 m
 R-046 weight: 34,56 kg
 Storage durability in rough conditions: 3 years
 Storage durability in normal conditions: 10 years

Compatible artillery 
Bold indicates equipment, which is currently in service with the Bulgarian military

R-045 
 2S1 Gvozdika
 M-30

R-046 
 2S3 Akatsiya
 152 mm gun 2A36
 152 mm howitzer 2A65
 D-20

References 
 Еднократен предавател за смущения Р-045/Р-046
 Website of Samel90, manufacturer of the Starshel rounds

Projectiles
Military equipment of Bulgaria
Electronic warfare
Warsaw Pact
Electronic warfare equipment